Salima Mazari (born 1980) is an Afghan politician, who served as the District Governor of Charkint District in Balkh province in Afghanistan and one of the three women district governors in Afghanistan.

Biography 
Mazari was born in Iran in 1980, a refugee as her family had escaped the Soviet invasion of Afghanistan. She grew up in Iran, earning a degree from the University of Tehran and working for the International Organization for Migration, before returning to Afghanistan. In 2018, she was named District Governor of Charkint District in Balkh province. As governor, she formed a security commission to recruit local militias into the fight against the Taliban. In 2020, she negotiated the surrender of over 100 Taliban soldiers in her province.

Amid the 2021 Taliban offensive, she refused to flee as several other governors in the country did, with her district putting up significant resistance to the Taliban. Until the complete collapse of the Islamic Republic of Afghanistan following the Fall of Kabul, hers was one of the few districts in the country to remain unoccupied by the Taliban. Since August 18, the news reports were concerned that whether she had been captured by the Taliban. As per subsequent Time.com news report, Mazari was at provinicial Governer's office when news of surrender of Balkh and fall of Mazar-i-Sharif reached her, after realizing her district Charkint, too is blocked  she decided to close fight to avoid blood bath and  escaped to undisclosed U.S. location  with the help of 2021 U.S. evacuation from Afghanistan

She was recognized as one of the BBC's 100 women of 2021.

See also
 Zarifa Ghafari

References

1980 births
Living people
21st-century Afghan politicians
21st-century Afghan women politicians
Hazara politicians
University of Tehran alumni
BBC 100 Women